Sandor Matyas Szoke (2 October 1927 – 10 July 1990) was a Hungarian-born Australian fencer. He competed in the individual and team sabre events at the 1956 Summer Olympics. He was a founding member of the VRI Fencing Club in May 1949, a week after the IOC awarded Melbourne the 15th Olympiad.

References

1927 births
1990 deaths
Australian male fencers
Olympic fencers of Australia
Fencers at the 1956 Summer Olympics
Hungarian emigrants to Australia
Fencers from Budapest